Singani is a town on Grande Comore Island in the Comoros.

Populated places in Grande Comore